Celenna festivaria is a moth of the family Geometridae first described by Johan Christian Fabricius in 1794. It is found in India, Sri Lanka, Myanmar, Borneo, Java Taiwan, the Ryukyu Islands and Luzon in the Philippines.

Description
Its ground color is brown. Bright green medial blotches are found on both wings. The hindwing patch has an excavation at the center of its interior margin.

Subspecies
Three subspecies are recognized.
Celenna festivaria formosensis Inoue, 1964 - India, Sri Lanka, Myanmar, Borneo, Java, Taiwan
Celenna festivaria manifesta Inoue, 1964 - Ryukyu Islands
Celenna festivaria temperata Prout, 1925 - Philippines

References

Moths of Asia
Moths described in 1794